Spathiphyllum floribundum, the snowflower, peace lily, is a flowering plant in the family Araceae, native to northwestern South America from Panama east to Venezuela and south to Peru.

 
It is a herbaceous perennial plant. The leaves are oval to lanceolate, 12–20 cm long and 5–9 cm broad. The flowers are produced in a spadix, surrounded by a 10–20 cm long, greenish- or yellowish-white spathe.

References

floribundum
Flora of Panama
Flora of Venezuela
Flora of Peru
Taxa named by N. E. Brown
Taxa named by Jean Jules Linden
Taxa named by Édouard André